Jacques Borker (born 29 September 1922 in Paris, France) is a French artist and is the most influential and one of the best known tapestry designers of the twentieth century. Borker has long been admired for his fantastic abstract, art deco and contemporary tapestry designs.
Working out of Paris during some of the most important art movements of the era, Borker is known for his bold interpretation of the abstract, as well as for his mastery of line work. Borker's work is most associated with Bauhaus and the Art Deco art movement.

Biography
Borker studied various artistic disciplines including architecture at Ecole des Beaux Arts, where he was a contemporary and friend of Le Corbusier, Charlotte Perriand, Jean Lurçat, Zao Wou-Ki, Pierre Soulages and Hans Hartung. He also studied Ceramic art, tapestry and industrial design.

During World War II, Borker was involved in the liberation of Toulouse and was active in the French resistance.

Borker's work has been exhibited at art galleries and museums in many cities around the world.

Borker is the brother of Jules Borker, the French human rights lawyer and former Secretary-General of the Paris
branch of the French Bar Association.

Impact
It has been said that for the first time in France during the second half of the twentieth century, due to Borker's work, architecture, painting and design are met in France with grace and harmony. Furthermore, Borker's creative research using simple everyday materials and bright colours has been quoted as "a pleasure for the eye" and his work has given a "certain elegance to late 20th century French art".

Personal life
Jacques Borker was married to Paulette Borker, who was also involved with the French resistance during World War II.

Borker currently resides in the Parisian street Rue de Seine.
He turned 100 in September 2022.

References

1922 births
Living people
Artists from Paris
French Resistance members
École des Beaux-Arts alumni
French centenarians
Men centenarians